The 2015 Rajshahi mosque bombing was a suicide attack which occurred on 25 December 2015 during Friday Prayers at an Ahmadi Muslim mosque in Mochmoli village, in Bagmara Upazila, in Rajshahi District, Bangladesh. One person was killed and at least between three and ten people were injured in the attack. The single fatality was the perpetrator of the attack.

An estimated 70 Ahmadi Muslim worshippers were inside the mosque during the Friday congregation prayers. Witness reports indicate that the bomber first entered the mosque and performed his prayers separately, at the rear end of the prayer hall. Afterwards, he moved forward close to other worshippers present at the mosque and placed his hands inside his pockets, after which the bomb exploded. The identity and motive of the perpetrator is yet unknown.

Responsibility
The Islamic State of Iraq and the Levant has claimed responsibility for the attack. However, locals have stated earlier that members of the Wahhabi-inspired Ahl al-Hadith Andolon Bangladesh, which runs a neighbouring mosque, may be responsible for the attack. On the other hand, local police have blamed Jamaat-ul-Mujahideen Bangladesh (JMB) for recent rise in violence, including the attack at the Ahmadiyya mosque.

References

Terrorist incidents in Bangladesh in 2015
Persecution of Ahmadis
2015 in Bangladesh
Rajshahi District
Terrorism in Bangladesh
2015 crimes in Bangladesh